Max Wirestone is an American author and librarian. He is known for his "Dahlia Moss Mysteries," a series of books about a female millennial gamer who solves mysteries.

Life
Wirestone is a graduate of the Alabama School of Mathematics and Science, and received college degrees in English and German from Washington University in St. Louis. Before becoming a novelist he worked as a librarian. His last name, Wirestone, is a name that he and his husband came up with when they got married. He currently resides in Lawrence, Kansas with his husband and son.

Books

References

External links
Author's website
Author's twitter

Living people
Washington University in St. Louis alumni
21st-century American novelists
American mystery writers
People from Lawrence, Kansas
American male novelists
21st-century American male writers
American librarians
Date of birth missing (living people)
Place of birth missing (living people)
Year of birth missing (living people)